St. Francisville Bridge may refer to:
John James Audubon Bridge (Mississippi River) in Louisiana
Wabash Cannonball Bridge over the Wabash River in Illinois and Indiana